Timofei Moșneaga (6 March 1932 – 1 June 2014) was a Moldovan physician and statesman who served as the Minister of Health of Moldova from 1994 to 1997. He was the Director of the Republican Clinical Hospital for over forty years (1960–2003). As of 2017, the hospital is named after him.

Early life 
Timofei Moșneaga was born on 6 March 1932 in Corjova, Dubăsari district to Vasile and Eufrosenia Moșneaga. He was one of eight children, having four sisters and three brothers.

He attended primary school in his home village, then secondary school in Dubăsari. In the period 1947–1950 he attended the School of Medical Assistants in Bender and, after graduation – the Faculty of General Medicine of Chișinău State Institute of Medicine. In 1959, after he had obtained his medical diploma, Timofei Moșneaga was admitted to doctoral studies. Shortly after finishing his studies, he defended the MD thesis in medical sciences and afterwards was conferred the academic rank of Associate Professor.

Career 

In 1960, at the age of 28, he was appointed Director of Republican Clinical Hospital. Timofei Moșneaga held this position for over four decades and brought an essential contribution to the development of the institution. The old hospital in adapted buildings during the post-war period did not meet the standards in specialized assistance. Therefore, the new Director became interested in building a new hospital. Finally, after considerable efforts, the hospital was put into operation.

Shortly, specialized departments for patients with somatic and surgical diseases endowed with up-to-date medical technologies, including equipment for the modern method of lithotripsy of kidney stones opened at the RCH. Departments of gastric surgery, proctology, vascular surgery, paediatric cardiac surgery and endoscopic surgery were established in the surgical building. The Department of Medical Diagnosis was equipped with up-to-date equipment, thus, establishing offices of magnetic resonance tomography, the Laboratory of Clinical Immunology, Bacteriological Laboratory, the Department of Angiography of Peripheral Vessels and Cardio angiography.

Timofei Moșneaga brought a great contribution to the creation of proper conditions for teaching, scientific and clinical activities carried out at 15 chairs of the CSIM.

He has published circa 150 scientific papers, including 3 monographs, as well as educated 16 Doctors of Medicine.

In 1980 Moldovan filmmaker Anatol Codru produced a biopic about Timofei Moșneaga titled My Life's Dream.
The music for the film was composed by Arkady Luxemburg.
For the design and construction of the new building of the Republican Clinical Hospital, Timofei Moșneaga was awarded the title of Laureate of the State Prize of the Moldavian SSR in literature, arts and architecture (1982).

In 2002, in honour of the 185th anniversary of the Republican Clinical Hospital's foundation, as well as the 70th birthday of head physician Moșneaga, Moldovan publicist Ion Stici wrote a biography titled Timofei Moșneaga – The People's Doctor.

For outstanding merits in his professional activity, Timofei Moșneaga was awarded the honorary titles of Merited Doctor of the Moldavian SSR, People's Doctor of the USSR and received high state distinctions, among which the Order of the Republic. In 2003 he was awarded the title of Honorary Director of the Republican Clinical Hospital.

Political career 
He joined the Communist Party of the Soviet Union in 1953. In 1957, he was elected Member of the Chișinău City Council.

In 1989, Timofei Moșneaga was elected People's Deputy of the Soviet Union and was member of the Supreme Soviet Committee on Foreign Affairs. 

He, alongside Eugen Doga were the only members of the Moldavian faction that penned a letter to Soviet President Mikhail Gorbachev, condemning the separatist movement brewing in Transnistria at the time. Following Moldova's proclamation of independence, he was appointed leader of the Moldovan group of special observers in the Soviet of Republics of the Supreme Soviet of the USSR.

In 1994, he was elected Member of the Moldovan Parliament, being a member of the Committee for Social Protection, Healthcare and Ecology.

In the period 1994–1997, Timofei Moșneaga held the office of Minister of Health of Moldova. During his term as Minister, he advocated for the preservation of the national medical heritage, strengthening the efficiency of the country's medical personnel and health institutions. He worked with the Japanese government to attract investments into the national healthcare system and as a result, a large part of hospitals across Moldova were equipped with Siemens' state of the art medical equipment. In 1995, the Health Ministry headed by Timofei Moșneaga elaborated the National Healthcare Law, which to this day, regulates the activity of the Moldovan health system. During his mandate, he established relations with the World Health Organization, whose regional office was opened in Chișinău.

Personal life 
Timofei Moșneaga was married to Maria Moșneaga (née Burlacu) an obstetrician-gynaecologist, Doctor of Medicine, recipient of the Order of Work Glory. They had two sons.

Legacy 
Timofei Moșneaga passed away on 1 June 2014 in Chișinău.

His bust stands among 41 other distinguished Moldovan doctors on the Alley of Brilliant Scientists and Doctors in Chișinău, near the Nicolae Testemițanu State University of Medicine and Pharmacy.

As of 19 July 2017, per the Moldovan Cabinet's decision, the Republican Clinical Hospital bears the name of Timofei Moșneaga.

On 6 October 2017, in honour of the RCH's 200th anniversary, a bas-relief commemorating Timofei Moșneaga was installed at the hospital's main entrance.

Honours and awards

Bibliography 
 
 
 
 

1932 births
2014 deaths
Moldovan Ministers of Health
Agrarian Party of Moldova politicians
Members of the Supreme Soviet of the Soviet Union
Moldovan physicians
Moldovan healthcare managers
Recipients of the Order of Lenin
Recipients of the Order of the Republic (Moldova)
Recipients of the USSR State Prize
People from Corjova, Dubăsari